By the Light of the Silvery Moon is a 1953 American musical film. It is the sequel to On Moonlight Bay. Like its predecessor, the movie is based loosely on the Penrod stories by Booth Tarkington.

Plot
By the Light of the Silvery Moon relates the further adventures of the Winfield family in small town Indiana as daughter Marjorie Winfield's (Doris Day)  boyfriend, William Sherman (Gordon MacRae), returns from the Army after World War I. Bill and Marjorie's on-again, off-again romance provides the backdrop for other family crises, caused mainly by son Wesley's (Billy Gray) wild imagination.

Primary cast
 Doris Day as Marjorie Winfield
 Gordon MacRae as William 'Bill' Sherman
 Billy Gray as Wesley Winfield
 Leon Ames as George Winfield
 Rosemary DeCamp as Alice Winfield
 Mary Wickes as Stella
 Russell Arms as Chester Finley
 Maria Palmer as Renee LaRue
 Howard Wendell as John H. Harris
 Walter Flannery as Ronald 'PeeWee' Harris

Songs
 "By the Light of the Silvery Moon (song)"
 “Your Eyes Have Told Me So”
 “Just One Girl”
 “Ain’t We Got Fun”
 “If You Were the Only Girl”
 “Be My Little Baby Bumble Bee”
 “I’ll Forget You”
 “King Chanticleer”

References

External links
 
 
 
 
 
 Article at DorisDay.net

1953 films
1953 musical films
Films directed by David Butler
Films scored by Max Steiner
Films set in Indiana
Films set in the 1910s
1950s English-language films
Warner Bros. films
Films based on works by Booth Tarkington
American musical films
1950s American films